Humphrey's Dairy Farm is a historic farm property at 1675 Shady Grove Road in Garland County, Arkansas, several miles southeast of Hot Springs. The farm complex is set on the north side of the road, and includes a large Craftsman house, built about 1920, a derelict gambrel-roofed barn of similar vintage, and a dairy processing plant built about 1930. The farm was started by Harris Humphrey in 1911, and was for many years an important local supplier to the Hot Springs market.

The farm was listed on the National Register of Historic Places in 2012.

See also
National Register of Historic Places listings in Garland County, Arkansas

References

Houses on the National Register of Historic Places in Arkansas
Houses completed in 1920
Buildings and structures in Garland County, Arkansas
National Register of Historic Places in Garland County, Arkansas